The Tió de Nadal (meaning in English "Christmas Log"), also known simply as tió (firewood log), soca or tronc(a) (trunk), is a character in Catalan mythology relating to a Christmas tradition widespread in Catalonia, Majorca (known as Nadaler), Occitania (Southern France) and Andorra. In Aragon it is also called, in aragonese, Tizón de Nadal, Toza de Nadal or Tronca de Nadal.

The Tió de Nadal is related to the tradition of the germanic Christmas tree, also a bearer of gifts for the little ones, and with the british Yule log (tizón do Nadal in Galicia and Cachafuòc, Cachofio or Soc de Nadal in Occitania).

Overview

Recently, the Tió has come to stand up on two or four stick legs with a broad smiling face painted on its higher end, enhanced by a littler red sock hat (a miniature of the traditional barretina) and often a three-dimensional nose. Those accessories have been added only in recent times, altering the more traditional and rough natural appearance of a dead piece of wood.

Beginning with the Feast of the Immaculate Conception (December 8), one gives the tió a little bit to "eat" every night and usually covers him with a blanket so that he will not be cold. The story goes that in the days preceding Christmas, children must take good care of the log, keeping it warm and feeding it, so that it will defecate presents on Christmas Day or Eve.

On Christmas Day or, in some households, on Christmas Eve, one puts the tió partly into the fireplace and orders it to defecate. The fire part of this tradition is no longer as widespread as it once was, since many modern homes do not have a fireplace. To make it defecate, one beats the tió with sticks, while singing various songs of Tió de Nadal.

The tradition says that before beating the tió all the kids have to leave the room and go to another place of the house to pray, asking for the tió to deliver a lot of presents. Nowadays, the praying tradition has been left behind. Still, children go to a different room, usually the kitchen, to warm their stick next to a fire. This makes the perfect excuse for the relatives to do the trick and put the presents under the blanket while the kids are praying or warming their sticks.

The tió does not drop larger objects, as those are considered to be brought by the Three Wise Men.  It does leave candies, nuts and torrons, and small toys. Depending on the region of Catalonia, it may also give out dried figs. What comes out of the Tió is a communal rather than individual gift, shared by everyone there.

The tió is often popularly called Caga tió ("shitting log", "poo log").  This derives from the many songs of Tió de Nadal that begin with this phrase, which was originally (in the context of the songs) an imperative ("Shit, log!"). The use of this expression as a name is not believed to be part of the ancient tradition and its use is discouraged.

Caga tió song 

A song is sung during this celebration. After hitting the tió softly with a stick during the song, it is hit harder on the words Caga tió!  Then somebody puts their hand under the blanket and takes a gift. The gift is opened and then the song begins again. There are many Caga tió songs connected to the holiday and the log. The following variant is one of the more popular versions of this song:

See also
 Bûche de Noël
 Caganer
 Piñata
 Yule log

References

External links
 

Catalan folklore
Catalan mythology
Catalan words and phrases
Christmas characters
Christmas in Spain
Christmas gift-bringers